Burke was an electoral district of the Legislative Assembly in the Australian state of Queensland from 1873 to 1932, and again from 1960 to 1972. It covered remote rural areas in Northwest Queensland.

It originally existed as a single-member district until 1888, when it was changed to a dual-member district. This was changed at the next election when it was split into two single electorates - Burke and Croydon. Burke was amalgamated into the district of Carpentaria from the 1932 election, but was revived for the 1960 election, until it was finally abolished at the 1972 election and renamed Mount Isa.

Members for Burke

Election results

See also
 Electoral districts of Queensland
 Members of the Queensland Legislative Assembly by year
 :Category:Members of the Queensland Legislative Assembly by name

References 

Former electoral districts of Queensland
1873 establishments in Australia
1932 disestablishments in Australia
1960 establishments in Australia
1972 disestablishments in Australia